This article details the complete discography of American post-punk band Tuxedomoon.

Studio albums

Soundtrack albums

Live albums

Compilation albums

Extended plays

Singles
"Joeboy the Electronic Ghost"/"Pinheads on the Move" (1978)
"Stranger"/"Love/No Hope" (1979)
"What Use?"/"Crash" (1980)
"Dark Companion"/"59 to 1 Remix" (1980)
"Urban Leisure Suite Part IV" (1980)
"Jinx"/"Incubus (Blue Suite)" (1981)
"Une Nuit au Fond de la Frayere"/"Egypt" (1981)
"Ninotchka"/"Again" (1982)
"What Use?" (remix) (1982)
"Why Is She Bathing?" (1982)
"Soma" (1984)
"Plan Delta" (1986)
"Boxman (The City)"/"The Train" (1987)
"You" (new version)/"Atlantis" (remix) (1987)
"Michael's Theme"/Interview (1988)

References

External links

Discographies of American artists
Rock music discographies